Who Is Sylvia? may refer to:
 Who Is Sylvia? (play), a 1950 comedy play by Terence Rattigan
 Who Is Sylvia? (TV series) a 1967 British television sitcom
 "Who is Silvia?", song from Shakespeare's play The Two Gentlemen of Verona
 "Who is Silvia?", English name for Franz Schubert's 1826 German-language  "An Sylvia" of Shakespeare's song

See also
 The Goat, or Who Is Sylvia?, 2000 play by Edward Albee (title derived from Shakespeare's song)